Grampy's Indoor Outing is a 1936 Fleischer Studio animated short, starring Betty Boop and Grampy.

Synopsis
Betty offers to take her nephew Junior to see the carnival. Before they can leave the house, it starts to thunder and rain, making it impossible to attend the carnival.  Betty's upstair's neighbor Grampy saves the day by using his crazy inventions to turn the apartment (and eventually, even the whole house with a huge umbrella covering it) into a circus.

References

External links
 Grampy's Indoor Outing at Big Cartoon Database.
 Grampy's Indoor Outing on YouTube

 Grampy's Indoor Outing at IMDb

1936 films
Betty Boop cartoons
1930s American animated films
American black-and-white films
1936 animated films
Paramount Pictures short films
Fleischer Studios short films
Short films directed by Dave Fleischer